Macrocheles baliensis is a species of mite in the family Macrochelidae.

References

baliensis
Articles created by Qbugbot
Animals described in 2001